Frozan Fana (born 1969) was a candidate in the 2009 Afghan presidential election.
Her running mate was Mohammad Nasim Darmand.
She had never held political office before. However, she is the widow of Abdul Rahman, the assassinated Afghan Aviation Minister.

Fana is an Orthopaedic surgeon.

Fana was criticized for using campaign posters that had her picture on it.

One other woman was a candidate for president in 2009, Shahla Atta.  
She was already a member of the Wolesi Jirga, Afghanistan's National Legislature.
After Massouda Jalal came sixth out of eighteen presidential candidates in 2004 then President Hamid Karzai appointed her Afghan Women's Affairs Minister.

According to Rosie DiManno, writing in the Toronto Star, Fana had difficulty campaigning due to her gender.
Fana described being ignored by security officials, when asked for security details when she scheduled public meetings, so much of her campaign revolved around inviting guests to her home.

DiManno described Fana's concerns that her husband had been murdered by elements within Karzai's administration, who saw him as a potential candidate for president.

DiManno quoted Fana on the difficulties Fana enoountered acting as high-profile woman who could serve as a role-model to other women: "These men don't even want me to practise as a doctor. There is so much risk for women, so much violence against them in their own homes. Who cares? Not the men in power. They do nothing.

Preliminary voting results placed Fana eighth in a field of thirty-two. The 8,159 votes for Fana represented less than 0.5% of the total votes cast.

References

External links
www.frozan.org/

Members of the House of the People (Afghanistan)
Living people
Year of birth uncertain
1969 births
21st-century Afghan women politicians
21st-century Afghan politicians